Grace Elizabeth Sorrel Clough  (born 21 June 1991) is a former British Paralympic rower who competed in the mixed coxed four event. She won multiple gold medals at the World Rowing Championships and World Rowing Cup alongside a gold at the 2016 Summer Paralympics. Clough was inducted into the Sheffield Legends Walk of Fame in 2016 and named a Member of the Order of the British Empire in 2017.

Early life and education
Clough was born on 21 June 1991 in Sheffield, England. She was born with Erb's palsy and had multiple operations to repair nerve damage in her shoulders shortly after birth. While at school, Clough began playing sports as a basketball player and captain in Yorkshire. She also played on a football team at the University of Leeds while completing a degree in sociology. She continued her rowing career while studying at Kellogg College, Oxford.

Career
In 2013, Clough began rowing as a member of the Nottingham Rowing Club after being classified as a PR3 rower and completing training in Banyoles, Spain. As a competitor for Great Britain, Clough won a gold medal in the mixed coxed four at the 2014 World Rowing Championships and 2015 World Rowing Championships. Similarly, Clough won gold in the mixed coxed four events at the 2014 World Rowing Cup in  Aiguebelette-le-Lac, France and the 2015 World Rowing Cup in Varese, Italy. 

In the following years, Clough won an additional gold medal in mixed coxed four at the 2016 Summer Paralympics and the 2017 World Rowing Championships. In 2018, Clough won gold at the 2018 World Rowing Championships in the mixed coxed four event. After the event, Clough took a year off to heal from a pelvic injury. In 2020, Clough planned to become a physical education teacher following her post-secondary studies. With her transition to teaching, Clough ended her rowing career.

Awards and honours
In 2016, Clough was inducted into the Sheffield Legends Walk of Fame. In 2017, she was named a Member of the Order of the British Empire at the 2017 New Year Honours.

References

External links

1991 births
Living people
English female rowers
Paralympic rowers of Great Britain
World Rowing Championships medalists for Great Britain
Paralympic gold medalists for Great Britain
Medalists at the 2016 Summer Paralympics
Members of the Order of the British Empire
Alumni of the University of Leeds
Alumni of Kellogg College, Oxford
Paralympic medalists in rowing
Rowers at the 2016 Summer Paralympics